Road Trips Volume 2 Number 4 is a two-CD live album by the American rock band the Grateful Dead.  The eighth in their "Road Trips" series of albums, it was recorded on May 26 and 27, 1993, at the Cal Expo Amphitheatre in Sacramento, California.  A third, bonus disc included with some copies of the album was recorded at the same two concerts.   The album was released on August 25, 2009.

Track listing

Disc One
May 26, 1993:

Disc Two
May 26, 1993:

May 27, 1993:

Bonus Disc
May 27, 1993:

May 26, 1993:

Personnel

Grateful Dead
 Jerry Garcia – lead guitar, vocals
 Mickey Hart – drums
 Bill Kreutzmann – drums
 Phil Lesh – electric bass, vocals
 Bob Weir – rhythm guitar, vocals
 Vince Welnick – keyboards, vocals

Production
Produced by Grateful Dead
Compilation produced by David Lemieux and Blair Jackson
CD mastering by Jeffrey Norman
Cover art by Scott McDougall
Photos by Susana Millman and Bob Minkin
Package design by Steve Vance

Set lists
Following are the complete set lists for the concerts excerpted on Road Trips Volume 2 Number 4:

May 26, 1993

First set: "Samson and Delilah"*, "Here Comes Sunshine"*, "Walkin' Blues"*, "Broken Arrow"**, "Ramble On Rose"**, "Stuck Inside of Mobile with the Memphis Blues Again"**, "Deal"*
Second set: "Box of Rain"*, "Victim or the Crime"* > "Crazy Fingers"* > "Playing in the Band"* > "Drums"* > "Space" > "Corrina"* > "Playing in the Band"* > "China Doll"* > "Around and Around"*
Encore: "Liberty"*

May 27, 1993

First set: "Shakedown Street"*, "The Same Thing"*, "Dire Wolf"*, "Beat It On Down the Line", "High Time"*, "When I Paint My Masterpiece"*, "Cumberland Blues", "Promised Land"
Second set: "Picasso Moon"** > "Fire on the Mountain"** > "Wave to the Wind", "Cassidy"** > "Uncle John's Band"** > "Cassidy"** > "Drums" > "Space" > "The Other One" > "Wharf Rat" > "Sugar Magnolia"
Encore: "Gloria"**

*included on Road Trips Volume 2 Number 4''
**included on bonus disc

Notes

Road Trips albums
2009 live albums